Igor Corman (born 17 December 1969) is a Moldovan politician and diplomat, President of the Moldovan Parliament from 30 May 2013 until 29 December 2014.

Biography 
Igor Corman was born on 17 December 1969 in the village of Ciulucani, in Telenești District, in the Republic of Moldova. Former Komsomol member.

Studies
Igor Corman graduated from the Faculty of History of the State University of Chişinău, Moldova (1990) and then the Faculty of History of "Al.I.Cuza" University of Iasi, Romania (1992). In the years 1992-1994 he completed doctoral studies at "Al.I.Cuza" University of Iasi, Romania, and later, in 1994-1995, post-doctoral studies at "Ludwig Maximilian" University of Munich, Germany.

In 1996, Igor Corman received his PhD in History.

In 1997, Igor Corman continued his professional training at the George Marshall College in Garmisch-Partenkirchen, Germany, and in 2002 he lectured the peacekeeping courses at Newport in the United States.

Career
After graduating from the educational institutions, since 1995 Igor Corman has worked in the Ministry of Foreign Affairs of Moldova. Thus, between 1995-1997 he worked as secretary III, secretary II and secretary I in the Directorate for Policy Analysis and Planning of the Ministry. During the period 1997-2001 he served as secretary III, secretary II, secretary I - responsible for political relations and charged with business in the Embassy of the Republic of Moldova in Germany. Between 2001-2003, he worked as Director of the General Department for Europe and North America at the Ministry of Foreign Affairs.

In the period 2004-2009, Igor Corman continued his diplomatic career as Ambassador of the Republic of Moldova to Germany, by joining the Kingdom of Denmark.

Since 29 July 2009 Igor Corman is deputy to the Parliament of the Republic of Moldova from the Democratic Party of Moldova and holds the post of President of the Foreign Policy and European Integration Commission. From 30 May 2013 until 29 December 2014 he was the President of the Parliament of the Republic of Moldova. On 15 October 2015 he announced at the parliamentary session that he was giving up his mandate and withdrawing from politics in order to get involved in a project with foreign investment.

Besides Romanian and Russian, Igor Corman speaks fluently German and English. He is married and has two children.

Distinctions and decorations 
In 2006 ,Igor Corman was decorated with the "Civic Merit" Medal by the President of the Republic of Moldova, Vladimir Voronin, and in 2009 - with the Order of the "Grand Cross of Merit"by the President of the Federal Republic of Germany.

On 24 July 2014 Igor Corman was awarded the "Order of the Republic" by the President of the Republic of Moldova, Nicolae Timofti, "for decisive contributions to the accomplishment of the major foreign policy objective of the Republic of Moldova - political association and economic integration with the European Union".

Gallery

External links 
 Igor CORMAN
 Site-ul Parlamentului Republicii Moldova
 Partidul Democrat din Moldova

References

1969 births
Living people
Alexandru Ioan Cuza University alumni
Moldova State University alumni
20th-century Moldovan historians
Moldovan MPs 2009–2010
Presidents of the Moldovan Parliament
Commanders Crosses of the Order of Merit of the Federal Republic of Germany
Democratic Party of Moldova MPs
Ambassadors of Moldova to Germany